Mondial is a Dutch company specialising in the manufacture of amusement rides.

Products

Giant Wheels
 RR 35
 RR 45 
 RR 55

Parkrides
 Revolution
 Roll Over
 Splash Over
 Turbine (park model)
 Ultra Max
 Ventura

Towerrides
 Observation Tower
 Sky Riser
 Sky Seeker
 Wind Seeker

Transportable
 Capriolo 8
 Capriolo 10
 Diablo
 Furioso
 Heart Breaker
 Inferno
 Jet Force
 Mistral
 Roll Over
 Shake
 Super Nova
 Swinger
 Top Scan
 Tornado
 Turbine

Concepts
 Avalanche
 Blender
 Drifter
 Escape
 Surf's Up
 Wild Romance
 Propellor

Ride Installations

References

External links

Amusement ride manufacturers
Dutch companies established in 1987
Manufacturing companies of the Netherlands
Manufacturing companies established in 1987
Companies based in Friesland
Heerenveen